"Change the Game" is the second single from rapper Jay-Z from his 2000 album The Dynasty: Roc La Familia. It features guest raps by Memphis Bleek and Beanie Sigel, production from Rick Rock and backing vocals by Static Major. Upon release, the song's intention was to promote Sigel and Bleek, but Steve Juon of RapReviews.com considers Jay-Z to outperform both rappers. A music video directed by David Meyers was made for "Change the Game."

Remix
A remix to Change the Game features Bleek and Sigel, along with Tha Dogg Pound members Daz and Kurupt. The remix appears on The Professional 2 album by DJ Clue. It can also be found on Tha Dogg Pound compilation album 2002.

Critical reception
The song received positive reviews. Rap Reviews wrote "Even though Beans and Memph both have raps on this song, Jay starts and ends the track with the best flow and lyrics throughout."

Formats and track listings

CD
 "Change the Game (Radio Edit)" (3:40)
 "Change the Game (Instrumental)" (3:40)

Vinyl

A-Side
 "Change the Game (Radio Edit)" (3:07)
 "Change the Game (LP Version)" (3:08)
 "Change the Game (Instrumental)" (3:05)

B-Side
 "You, Me, Him and Her (Radio Edit)" (3:46)
 "You, Me, Him and Her (LP Version)" (3:46)
 "You, Me, Him and Her (Instrumental)" (3:43)

Charts

Release history

See also
List of songs recorded by Jay-Z

References

External links

2001 singles
Jay-Z songs
Beanie Sigel songs
Memphis Bleek songs
Roc-A-Fella Records singles
2000 songs
Songs written by Static Major
Songs written by Jay-Z
Songs written by Beanie Sigel